The 11th Pan American Games were held in Havana, Cuba from August 2 to August 18, 1991.

See also
 Honduras at the 1992 Summer Olympics

Nations at the 1991 Pan American Games
P
1991